CIIS, or the China Institute of International Studies is a professional research institute directly administered by the Ministry of Foreign Affairs of the People's Republic of China. The Institute primarily focuses on issues associated with global politics and economics. It also facilitates the decision making process of the central government.

The institute was founded in 1956 as the Institute of International Relations of the Chinese Academy of Sciences. It was renamed Institute of International Relations in 1958, and assumed its present name in December 1986. In 1998, the China Center for International Affairs, formerly a research institution of China's State Council, was incorporated with CIIS.

Organization 
The Institute researchers are mainly composed of senior diplomats and prominent scholars. There are also young graduates of IR backgrounds from advanced universities. The presidency is held by former Chinese Ambassadors; the incumbent president is Su Ge.

The organization comprises eight departments and four affiliate bodies:

Departments
 Department of Global Strategy
 Department of Information and Contingencies Analysis
 Department of American Studies
 Department of Asia-Pacific Security and Cooperation
 Department of EU Studies
 Department of Developing Countries Studies
 Department of Shanghai Cooperation Organisation Studies
 Department of World Economy and Development Studies

Affiliates
 China National Commission for Pacific Economic Cooperation
 China Commission of the Council for Security Cooperation in the Asia Pacific
 China International Studies and Academic Exchange Foundation
 China Arms Control and Disarmament Association

It also houses Research Centers on the study of European Union, the Middle East, the South Pacific, China's Energy Strategy, Periphery Security and World Economy and Security. In addition, the Institute runs the International Affairs Office, which is responsible for overseeing international liaisons, and an editorial office for the publication of the Chinese and English version of the bi-monthly journal International Studies, whose contributors include CIIS researchers and independent foreign affairs experts. In July 2020, the Research Center for Xi Jinping Thought on Foreign Affairs opened at CIIS.

Notes

References

External links 

 

Ministry of Foreign Affairs of the People's Republic of China
1956 establishments in China
Organizations established in 1956
United front (China)